Shama High School is a coeducational senior high school at Shama in the Shama District of the Western Region of Ghana.

History
The School was founded in 1990 as a result of the 1988 Educational Reforms in the Shama District Assembly, Shama.

Notable alumni

References

High schools in Ghana
Education in the Western Region (Ghana)
Educational institutions established in 1990
1990 establishments in Ghana